K-Klass are a British electronic music group from Wrexham, Wales and Chester, England, who are based in Manchester, England. Its original members were Andy Williams, Carl Thomas, Russ Morgan and Paul Roberts.

In 1991, K-Klass signed with the label Deconstruction Records scoring five top 40 hits on the UK Singles Chart and later to Parlophone. In the mid-1990s, K-Klass were one of the busiest and most successful remix acts around, remixing the likes of Bobby Brown, Janet Jackson & Luther Vandross, New Order, Rihanna, The Corrs, Whitney Houston, winning the IDA remixers of the year in 1996 for their mix of Carleen Anderson “True Spirit” then getting a GRAMMY nomination in 2002 for their remix of Samantha Mumba “Baby Come On Over”. Since leaving Parlophone Andy Williams and Carl Thomas have both left K-Klass leaving just Paul Roberts and Russell Morgan alongside original vocalist Bobbi Depasois as K-Klass. Roberts and Morgan run their own record label Klass Action

Career
Williams and Thomas teamed up with Morgan and Roberts, from Chester, after meeting at The Haçienda in Manchester during the 1980s. According to Paul Roberts:We all met at the Hacienda in 1988. We had met before, though. Andy and Carl had done some gigs. Myself and Russ went to see Andy and Carl's band, Interstate play in Chester supporting 808 State. Andy and Carl were already pretty established, but we had no gear at the time - it was basically an SH-101 and a little Tandy mixer. We took about five tracks to Eastern Bloc in Manchester, just to see what they thought. We didn't have a name for the band or anything, and the tracks were just numbers, but they were really keen, and we put it out on a white label. We were playing a lot of live shows at the time, and used to take along boxloads of stuff to sell, and it went down really well.

After recording the Wildlife EP, K-Klass's first hit was "Rhythm Is a Mystery", sung by Bobbi Depasois, and released in 1991. The track reached number 3 on the UK Singles Chart after a re-release the same year and featured prominently in the 1992 film Encino Man.

"Let Me Show You" reached number 13 in 1993. Subsequently, the band purchased a retired Royal Observer Corps underground bunker in Borras for use as a recording studio. They released two albums, Universal, featuring Depasois' vocals, and K2. In 1995, K-Klass won the I.D.A Best International Remixer award, the first UK artist to do so.

K-Klass have played many live events, including stints at nightclubs in Liverpool, Sheffield, Hong Kong and Ibiza as well as the Hollinwoodstock Music Festival in Oldham in 2014.

They have also been involved with producing and remixing tracks by other artists. K-Klass was one of the producers on the Pet Shop Boys album, Bilingual, and have also produced for Candi Staton, Rebekah Ryan, Rosie Gaines and The Corrs. They have remixed tracks by Carleen Anderson, Bobby Brown, Sunscreem, Kylie Minogue, Geri Halliwell, S Club 7 ("Bring It All Back") and M People. Their remix of "Baby Come On Over" by Samantha Mumba was nominated for a Grammy Award in 2002 in the Best Remix category.

Roberts and Morgan appeared on 97.3 Forth One's Friday Night Floorfillers on 22 February 2008, whilst covering for the regular presenter, Krystal.

In 2013, a collaboration with Lempo and Japwow on Applique Music, titled "Brass Attack" was featured on the album Done & Dusted.

Selected discography

Albums

Singles

Remixes

References

External links
K-Klass discography
K-Klass biography from BBC Wales
Interview on fantazia.org

People from Wrexham
British dance music groups
British record producers
British electronic dance music groups
British house music groups
Parlophone artists
Remixers